Espinar may refer to:

 Espinar Province, one of thirteen provinces in the Cusco Region of Peru
 Espinar District, one of eight districts of Espinar Province
 Espinar, an alternative name of Yauri, Peru, the capital of Espinar Province
 El Espinar, a municipality in the province of Segovia, Castile and León, Spain
 Fort Espinar, the current name of Fort Gulick, a former U.S. Army base in Panama